The Cuchumatanes alligator lizard (Abronia cuchumatanus), is a species of lizard in the family Anguidae. The species is endemic to Guatemala.

References

Abronia
Reptiles described in 2016
Endemic fauna of Guatemala